Xallıcalı (also, Khallydzhaly and Khalydzhaly) is a village and municipality in the Masally Rayon of Azerbaijan.  It has a population of 738.

References 

Populated places in Masally District